Hendevalan (also Romanized as Hendevālān, Hand Vālān, Hendavālān, and Hindvālan) is a village in Miyandasht Rural District, in the Central District of Darmian County, South Khorasan Province, Iran. At the 2006 census, its population was 1,005, in 225 families.

References 

Populated places in Darmian County